Southern Xinjiang or Nanjiang is the southern half of the Xinjiang Uyghur Autonomous Region of China. Its historical name was Altishahr, which also includes some territories in modern-day Afghanistan, Kyrgyzstan, and Tajikistan.

Southern Xinjiang includes the Tarim Basin and the adjacent mountainous area which includes Aksai Chin. Most of the inhabitants in Southern Xinjiang are Uyghurs.

See also 
 Altishahr
 Dzungaria
 Junggar Basin
 Southern Xinjiang railway
 Tarim Basin
 Tunganistan

Geography of Xinjiang